Divine was an American R&B girl group formed in 1996 who are best known for their 1998 hit single "Lately".  The group consisted of Kia Thornton, Nikki Bratcher and Tonia Tash.
They made a cover version of the George Michael song "One More Try". The group disbanded in 2000.

Discography

Albums 
 1998: Fairy Tales (Pendulum Records/Red Ant)

Singles

References 

American pop music groups
American contemporary R&B musical groups
American girl groups
Musical groups established in 1996
Musical groups disestablished in 2000